The Aiguilles Marbrées, (literally "marbled needles") is a mountain peak in the Mont Blanc massif, above the Glacier du Géant, with its summits forming part of the frontier between France and Italy. It is situated between the Col de Rochefort and the Col du Géant, and is easily accessed from the Torino Hut at Pointe Helbronner.

Seen from the north, the mountain has a triangular appearance. It contains two summits, the northern one being the highest. The lower, southern summit is separated by a broken rock ridge.

First ascents
The  Aiguilles Marbrées was first climbed on 17 August 1876 by Lionel Dècle, Henry Devouassod and Edouard Coupelin, who reached its highest point via the NE slope. The first winter climb was made on 21 January 1907 by G. Carugati, Miss Carugati, Joseph Petigax and Laurent Petigax.

The first ascent of the lower southern summit was made on 22 July 1989 by A. Hess, O. Leitz and Laurent Croux from  the Col du Géant and E Arête.

The summit is normally reached by an ascent of its northeastern ridge, from the Col de Rochefort. The route is graded F+/PD- on the adjectival climbing scale.

There are a small number of rock climbing routes on the mountain
North Summit (North-west ridge) Grade IV, one pitch of V. Height 270 metres, 3.5 hours (first ascent: G. Brignolo, Casteli and Marchiard, 1996)
North Summit (West spur) 8 pitches, one of grade V. 3 hours (first ascent: H Boisier, J Chaffat, 8 September 1979)

Geology 
Geologically speaking, the Aiguille Marbrées is part of the 'Swiss Unit' of Mont Blanc, and consists mostly of medium to coarse grained granites, together with some porphyritic rocks.

Rockfall research
A series of major rock falls occurred on the north side of the Aiguille Marbrées in summer 2007. This led to investment by the local authorities in research and monitoring of the state of the mountain. Both conventional surveying and photogrammetry were employed in order to create a geo-referenced digital elevation model of the mountain. This help researchers understand the reasons for the initial rockfall, as well as providing a baseline study for comparison with future surveys after subsequent rockfalls.

Notes

References

External links
 Aiguilles Marbrées on French IGN mapping portal
 Aiguille Marbrées on Google maps

Mountains of the Alps
Mont Blanc massif